For Hope is a 1996 American made-for-television drama film starring Dana Delany and directed by Bob Saget. Based on Saget's sister Gay, the movie showed the experience of a young woman fatally afflicted with the disease scleroderma. Other cast members included Tracy Nelson and Chris Demetral.

Dana Delany had to have some significant prosthetic makeup applied to simulate the various degrees of disfigurement the main character, Hope, experienced as a result of the disease.

The original airing achieved the top Nielsen ratings for the time slot. The movie has periodically been rerun on various TV networks and is available on DVD and VHS for a $20 donation at the Scleroderma Research Foundation.

An extra feature of the movie was that it included a cameo appearance by Scleroderma Research Foundation founder Sharon Monsky.

References

External links
 

1996 films
1996 drama films
1996 television films
American Broadcasting Company original programming
Films about diseases
Films directed by Bob Saget
American drama television films
1990s American films